Peter James Bayley (20 November 1944 – 10 April 2018) was a British scholar of French literature, specialising in 17th-century French literature, sermons and essays. He was Drapers Professor of French at the University of Cambridge from 1985 to 2011, and a Fellow of Gonville and Caius College, Cambridge from 1971 until his death.

Biography
Peter Bayley was born in Portreath, Cornwall, and was educated at Redruth Grammar School. In 1963, he went up to Emmanuel College, Cambridge to read modern and mediaeval languages (French and Spanish); in 1966, he graduated with a First. He continued at Emmanuel as a postgraduate student, and in 1969 was elected to a Research Fellowship. In 1971, he was awarded his PhD for a thesis on 17th-century French sermons. That same year, he was appointed to a college lectureship at, and was elected Fellow of, Gonville and Caius College. In 1974, he was appointed university assistant lecturer in the Department of French; and in 1978, university lecturer.

In 1982, Peter Rickard retired as Drapers Professor of French. Bayley was appointed acting head of department. The process of electing a new Drapers Professor was a protracted one, and he was installed in the chair only in 1985. At that time, it was unusual for Cambridge professors to supervise undergraduates; but Bayley did. Other offices he took on were: various college posts; 1989–1997, vice-president of the Association of University Professors and Heads of French; 1990–1992, president of the Society for French Studies; 1994–1996, member of the executive of the University Council for Modern Languages; and 2000–2002, chairman of the (newly formed) School of Arts and Humanities at Cambridge.

In 2006, he suffered a stroke, and a bad fall. He never fully recovered his faculties, and was unable to complete his monograph on the oratory of Jacques-Bénigne Bossuet (1627–1704). His friends had the novel and distressing experience of finding themselves the dominant partners in conversations. In 2011, he retired, and was presented by his colleagues with a volume in his honour containing contributions by leading scholars from the United Kingdom, France and North America. He increasingly spent his days at the house in Hackleton, Northamptonshire he shared with his partner Angus Bowie, classicist, of The Queen's College, Oxford; who delivered the eulogy at his funeral in Caius Chapel on 4 May 2018.

Honours
In 1988, Bayley was made an Officier (Officer) of the Ordre des Palmes Académiques by France. In 2006, he was promoted to Commandeur (Commander): this is the highest rank of the order and he was the first British academic under retirement age to achieve it.

Selected works

References

1944 births
2018 deaths
20th-century linguists
21st-century linguists
British literary historians
Scholars of French literature
People from Redruth
People educated at Redruth Grammar School
Alumni of Emmanuel College, Cambridge
Fellows of Emmanuel College, Cambridge
Fellows of Gonville and Caius College, Cambridge
Commandeurs of the Ordre des Palmes Académiques
Professors of the University of Cambridge